The Tyne Tees Steam Shipping Company provided shipping services in the United Kingdom from 1904 to 1943.

History

Four companies came together in 1904 to form the Tyne Tees Steam Shipping Company. These were:
The Tyne Steam Shipping Co. Ltd, 
The Tees Union Steamship Co. Ltd, 
The Free Trade Wharf Co. Ltd 
Furness Withy & Co. Ltd

Passenger services were operated between Newcastle upon Tyne, London and the continent until the Great Depression in the United Kingdom.

The vessels and interests of the company were purchased by Coast Lines in 1943.

The former Headquarters building is now the Hotel du Vin.

Routes : Passenger / Cargo and Cargo only 

Newcastle and Sunderland  to London / Antwerp / Rotterdam / Amsterdam / Dordrecht / Hamburg / Bremen / Ghent / Northern French Ports.

Middlesbrough  to Bremen / Hamburg.

Livery
Funnel : Black with red top and dividing white band.

Passenger / Cargo ships operated

References

Transport companies established in 1904
Transport companies disestablished in 1943
Defunct shipping companies of the United Kingdom
History of Newcastle upon Tyne
Companies based in Newcastle upon Tyne